The Cadore Viaduct is a road bridge in Italy, in the southern Alps.

History

Design
The main span is held up by two 85m steel struts.

Construction
It was built by longitudinal launching, by Mazzi. It opened in 1985.

Structure
The bridge is north of the northern terminus of the Autostrada A27 at Ponte nelle Alpi (Bridge into the Alps). The road is the SS51 Strada statale di Alemagana, maintained by ANAS, which to the north passes Tre Cime di Lavaredo. The route joins to become part of European route E66. It reaches Austria near Innichen in South Tyrol, also known as Trentino-Alto Adige/Südtirol. It enters Austria at East Tyrol.

To the north is Calalzo di Cadore. The Calalzo–Padua railway passes under the bridge. The former Dolomites Railway passed nearby to the north, around one mile away. The Slovenian capital of Ljubljana is eighty miles to the east.

See also
 List of highest bridges
 Platano Viaduct, built 1978
 Sfalassà Viaduct, built 1974

References

External links
 Structurae
 Highest Bridges

1985 establishments in Italy
Bridges completed in 1985
Buildings and structures in the Province of Belluno
Mountain passes of the Dolomites
Road bridges in Italy
Steel bridges